This is a summary of 1901 in music in the United Kingdom.

Events
April – Lucy Broadwood is a judge at the Westmoreland Festival.
May – Australian composer Percy Grainger arrives in the UK with his mother, Rose, after a stay in Germany.
22 June
date unknown – Gustav Holst marries soprano Isobel Harrison at Fulham Register Office.
John Ireland graduates from the Royal College of Music.
Ralph Vaughan Williams formally receives the degree of Doctor of Music from Cambridge University.

Popular music
"Come, Gentle Night!", words by Clifton Bingham, music by Edward Elgar.
"In the Dawn", words by A. C. Benson, music by Edward Elgar.

Classical music: new works
Herbert Brewer – Emmaus
Frank Bridge 
Scherzo Phantastick
Berceuse for viola or cello and piano
Samuel Coleridge-Taylor – Idyll
Edward Elgar – Cockaigne (In London Town)
Joseph Holbrooke – Queen Mab

Opera
Frederick Delius – A Village Romeo and Juliet (later revised, not performed until 1907)
Charles Villiers Stanford – Much Ado About Nothing

Musical theatre
17 June – The Toreador, with book by James T. Tanner and Harry Nicholls, music by Ivan Caryll and Lionel Monckton, and lyrics by Adrian Ross and Percy Greenbank, opens at the Gaiety Theatre (later moving to the Comedy Theatre, and runs for 675 performances. 
18 December – Bluebell in Fairyland, with book by Seymour Hicks, with music by Walter Slaughter and lyrics by Aubrey Hopwood and Charles H. Taylor, opens at the Vaudeville Theatre, and runs for 300 performances.

Births
23 May – Edmund Rubbra, composer (died 1986)
10 June – Eric Maschwitz (Holt Marvell), lyricist and broadcast executive (died 1969)
9 September – James Blades, orchestral percussionist (died 1999)
26 December – Victor Hely-Hutchinson, South African-born composer and radio executive (died 1947)
date unknown – Ivor R. Davies, organist and composer (died 1970)

Deaths
11 February – Henry Willis, organ builder, 79
31 March – Sir John Stainer, organist and composer, 60
3 April – Richard D'Oyly Carte, producer of Gilbert & Sullivan, 56
14 April – Alice Barnett, singer and actress, 54
June – Abel Jones (Bardd Crwst), balladeer, age unknown (born 1830)
23 June – Charles Kensington Salaman, pianist and composer, 87
22 October – Frederic Archer, organist, conductor and composer, 63

See also
 1901 in the United Kingdom

References

British Music, 1902 in
Music
British music by year
1900s in British music